Young Forever is the debut album from Scottish indie band Aberfeldy. It was recorded in mono using one microphone and produced by Jim Sutherland. The album achieved favourable reviews including NME, AllMusic and IndieLondon.

Two singles from the album made the UK singles chart: "Heliopolis by Night" reached number 66 in 2004 and "Love Is an Arrow" reached number 60 in 2005. Two other singles were released on 7" single only: "Vegetarian Restaurant" and "Summer's Gone".

Track listing
 "A Friend Like You"
 "Slow Me Down"
 "Love Is an Arrow"
 "Tie One On"
 "Summer's Gone"
 "Vegetarian Restaurant"
 "What You Do"
 "Young Forever"
 "Surly Girl"
 "Heliopolis by Night"
 "Something I Must Tell You"
 "Out of Love"

Bonus tracks on Australian release
13. "Jennifer" (B-side of "Heliopolis by Night" 7" single)
14. "Take It Away" (B-side of "Heliopolis by Night" CD single)

References 

2004 debut albums
Aberfeldy (band) albums
Rough Trade Records albums